Confusion Bay is a natural bay located on the north-east tip of the Baie Verte Peninsula of the island of Newfoundland, in the Canadian province of Newfoundland and Labrador.

Communities within Confusion Bay are Harbour Round and Brent's Cove. 

Bays of Newfoundland and Labrador